HML may refer to:
Hml (trigraph), used in Hmong
Hard Mobile Launcher, a nuclear-hardened transporter erector launcher
Hard money loan, a loan service used for real estate investors to flip homes
Hemel Hempstead railway station, England, station code
Hennessy–Milner logic, in computer science
Hialeah-Miami Lakes High School in Florida, US
Hindustan Motors, an Indian automotive manufacturer
Horus-Maat Lodge, a Thelemic magical order
Human Media Lab, in Kingston, Ontario, Canada
Luopohe Hmong language, spoken in China